Whirlwind is a supervillain appearing in American comic books published by Marvel Comics.

Publication history

The character first appeared in Tales To Astonish #50 (Dec. 1963) and was created by Stan Lee and Jack Kirby.

Fictional character biography
David Cannon was born in Kansas City, Missouri. After discovering his mutant power to move at great speeds at an early age, he turns to a life of crime. This eventually brings Cannon, using his first alias as the Human Top and pursuing his career as a jewel thief, into conflict with Giant-Man and the Wasp on several occasions. Defeated each time, Cannon then redesigns his costume and adopts the alias of "Whirlwind", and adopts the identity of Charles Matthews, chauffeur of Janet van Dyne. Whirlwind joined the supervillain group the second Masters of Evil, and participated in a plot to destroy the Avengers. He joined the third Masters of Evil, and participated in a Vermont battle against the Avengers. With Batroc the Leaper and Porcupine, he went on a mission for the Red Skull.

Cannon continues with the Charles Matthews identity, first with the intent of robbing van Dyne, later with the intent of hitting on van Dyne. In the role of Charles, he pines for Janet, making advances when Hank Pym is presumed to be dead during the run in Marvel Feature. Charles is later fired for trying to embezzle Janet's money, and Hank finally discovers that Charles is Whirlwind later on in the series, forcing Whirlwind to abandon the identity.

Whirlwind is then employed by master villain Count Nefaria and joined the Lethal Legion. Nefaria temporarily amplifies the abilities of Whirlwind and super-powered team-mates Power Man and the Living Laser before sending them against the Avengers. The effect, however, is temporary and their combined abilities are drained by Nefaria subsequently defeated by the Avengers. Whirlwind joined the third Masters of Evil in a plan to destroy the Avengers, but caused their defeat by attacking prematurely. Whirlwind later upgrades his costume when joining a new version of the Masters of Evil formed by Baron Zemo. Whirlwind partnered with the Trapster, obtained a new battle armor and weapons from the Tinkerer, and battled Captain America in an attempt to bolster his criminal reputation. He then partnered with the Tiger Shark, traveled to San Francisco to steal an experimental "psycho-circuit", and battled the West Coast Avengers. Whirlwind also shows signs of an obsession with the Wasp, as he forces prostitutes to dress in the Wasp's past costumes and then assaults them.

Whirlwind and the Trapster end up fighting, due to a bounty placed on the former by the up-and-coming criminal mastermind Ricadonna. Trapster glues Whirlwind to the floor just at the start of his spin. He continues twirling, breaking many of his bones, including his spine. He makes a full recovery and is forced to join Baron Zemo's team of Thunderbolts. After leaving them, he gathered a group of villains together and tried to extort money from the Thunderbolts' new director Norman Osborn, but was viciously beaten by Osborn and is now forced to work secretly. In Dark Reign: Zodiac, Cannon is shown as a mole for Zodiac, working as Norman's chauffeur.

Whirlwind later attacks Hank blaming for Janet's death during the "Secret Invasion" and outraged by Pym taking the Wasp codename. He is defeated by the Avengers Academy student Striker. In a conversation between Striker and his mother, it is revealed that she hired Whirlwind to stage the attack to gain publicity for Striker.

Whirlwind was recruited by the Mandarin and Zeke Stane into joining the other villains in a plot to take down Iron Man. Whirlwind receives a new costume from Mandarin and Zeke Stane.

During the "Infinity" storyline, Whirlwind was seen with Blizzard robbing banks when they are approached by Spymaster. Spymaster enlists Whirlwind and Blizzard to help him and the villains he recruited to attack the almost-defenseless Stark Tower.

Whirlwind was hired by Power Broker's "Hench" App to kill Ant-Man as part of the App's demonstration to Darren Cross. When Cross was unwilling to give Power Broker the 1.2 billion dollars he demanded for investment in the Hench app, this caused Power Broker to cancel the demo and cancel Whirlwind's assassination on Ant-Man.

During the "Avengers: Standoff!" storyline, Whirlwind was an inmate of Pleasant Hill, a gated community established by S.H.I.E.L.D. Using Kobik, S.H.I.E.L.D. transformed Whirlwind into a teenager named Scotty. When Baron Zemo and Fixer restored everyone's memories, Whirlwind went on a rampage with Absorbing Man. When the Hood and Titania show up to retrieve Absorbing Man, Whirlwind joins Absorbing Man in siding with Hood's Illuminati.

During the "Opening Salvo" part of the "Secret Empire" storyline, Whirlwind is among the villains that joins the Army of Evil. Whirlwind, Batroc the Leaper, and Living Laser attack a haggard, bearded man in torn World War II army uniform who identifies himself as Steve Rogers. He is assisted by people that appear to be Sam Wilson and Bucky Barnes with both his arms.

In a lead-up to the "Sins Rising" arc, Count Nefaria using a wheelchair later forms his latest incarnation of the Lethal Legion with Grey Gargoyle, Living Laser, and Whirlwind in a plot to target the Catalyst. At Empire State University, Dr. Curt Connors reveals the Catalyst to the crowd when the Lethal Legion attacks. While Grey Gargoyle and Whirlwind attack the people present, Living Laser helps Count Nefaria to operate the Catalyst. Spider-Man shows up and has a hard time fighting them due to the fact that his mind was focused on what a revived Sin-Eater did to Overdrive. Sin-Eater shows up and starts using the same gun he used on Overdrive on the Lethal Legion members while taking their powers. All four of them were sent to Ravencroft where they started to act like model inmates. It was mentioned that Whirlwind was attacked by the inmates that he knew.

As a side-effect of Sin-Eater's suicide upon copying Madame Web's precognition revealed that Kindred was using them, Whirlwind and the rest of the Lethal Legion regained their sins and are among the villains that went on a rampage.

During the "Sinister War" storyline, Kindred revived Sin-Eater again and one of the demonic centipedes that emerged from his body took possession of Whirlwind making him one of the members of the Sinful Six.

Powers and abilities
Whirlwind is a mutant who possesses the ability to rotate his body around its lengthwise axis at great speeds, without impairing his ability to see, speak, or interact with his environment (for instance, pick up objects or change clothes). His powers work so that he can never become dizzy. Although he can rotate at subsonic speeds he can only travel in a straight line for a limited time, or fly like a helicopter for an even shorter length of time. He possesses superhuman agility, reflexes, coordination, and balance, and often uses himself as a human battering ram. Whirlwind has the ability to focus air currents generated by his rotation into a jet stream powerful enough to blast a hole through a brick wall, as well as create a windscreen able to deflect matter as massive as a falling boulder. He also has the ability to create small tornadoes.

Whirlwind wears full body armor. Since upgrading his armor, Whirlwind has added to his offensive capabilities via the use of two  hardened tool-steel sawblades mounted on metal wrist bracelets, which are driven by two DC servo-motors each and activated by palm switches. He also uses thrown shuriken and razor sharp jacks, whose damaging potential is greatly increased by the velocity of his whirling powers.

Other versions

Heroes Reborn
In the Heroes Reborn reality, Whirlwind is featured as well. This version wears a streamlined suit of armor with multiple blades. He was hired by Hydra to attack Tony Stark. To this end, Whirlwind kidnapped Stark's secretary Pepper Potts and blackmailed Stark to come to the Stark International office on Long Island alone without his "bodyguard" Iron Man (unaware that Stark himself was in reality Iron Man). Going to the office without his Iron Man armor, Tony was more than ready to deal with Whirlwind without his armor. Using various gadgets to defend himself and Pepper, Stark had Whirlwind chase him down to a Stark International Lab. There Tony activated a Kinetic Intake Converter that threatened to destroy Whirlwind if he didn't surrender. Refusing to do so, Whirlwind was engulfed with the converter's energy and killed.

JLA/Avengers
Whirlwind is among the enthralled villains guarding Krona's stronghold. He tries to attack Thor from behind as Thor helps Red Tornado but is shot by Hawkeye.

Old Man Logan
In the pages of Old Man Logan, the elderly Logan awoke on Earth-616 and had a flashback to where Whirlwind, Red Skull, Baron Blood, Count Nefaria, and Spiral were standing over the dead bodies of the superheroes the day when the villains rose and the heroes fell.

In other media

Television
 Whirlwind appears in Iron Man, initially voiced by James Avery before Dorian Harewood took over in all subsequent appearances. This version is a servant of the Mandarin.
 Whirlwind appears in The Avengers: United They Stand episode "Command Decision", voiced by Peter Windrem. This version is a member of Baron Helmut Zemo's Masters of Evil.
 Whirlwind appears in The Super Hero Squad Show episode "A Brat Walks Among Us!". This version is a member of Doctor Doom's Lethal Legion.
 Whirlwind appears in The Avengers: Earth's Mightiest Heroes, voiced by Troy Baker. Introduced in the episode "The Man in the Anthill", he goes on a rampage after Ulysses Klaw hires him to steal a sonic emitter and fights the Wasp and Ant-Man before being incarcerated at the Big House until S.H.I.E.L.D. can transfer him to the Mutant Response Division's custody. In "Breakout, Part 1" however, Whirlwind and his fellow inmates escape due to a technological problem. In "Assault on 42", Whirlwind is apprehended by the Avengers and placed in the eponymous Prison 42. When Annihilus leads the Annihilation Wave in an attack against the prison, Whirlwind joins forces with the other inmates and the Avengers to fight them off, only to be killed during the fight.
 Whirlwind appears in the Ultimate Spider-Man episode "Me Time", voiced by Tom Kenny. He is hired by Doctor Octopus to cause a distraction for Spider-Man.
 Whirlwind appears in the Avengers Assemble episode "Spectrums", voiced again by Tom Kenny.
 Whirlwind appears in Marvel Disk Wars: The Avengers.
 Whirlwind appears in the Ant-Man episode "Not a Date", voiced by Fred Tatasciore.
 Whirlwind appears in the M.O.D.O.K. episode "Days of Future M.O.D.O.K.s", voiced by Kevin Michael Richardson.

Video games
 Whirlwind appears as the first boss of Captain America and The Avengers.
 Whirlwind appears in Marvel: Ultimate Alliance 2, voiced by Adam Jennings. This version is among several supervillains controlled with nanites and forced to help either the Anti-Registration or the Pro-Registration side. When the nanites fall under the Fold's control, Whirlwind joins the other villains in attacking both sides at the portal to Prison 42. He later attacks the heroes at the Fold's tower.
 Whirlwind appears as a boss and playable character in Lego Marvel's Avengers via the "Masters of Evil" DLC pack.
 Whirlwind appears in Marvel: Avengers Alliance 2.

References

External links
 Whirlwind at Marvel.com

Comics characters introduced in 1963
Characters created by Jack Kirby
Characters created by Stan Lee
Fictional blade and dart throwers
Fictional characters with air or wind abilities
Marvel Comics characters who can move at superhuman speeds
Marvel Comics characters with superhuman strength
Marvel Comics mutants
Marvel Comics supervillains